The RC Aachen is a German rugby union club from Aachen, North Rhine-Westphalia, currently playing in the 2e klasse, the 3 tier of Dutch Rugby after being promoted mid-seasob due to good results. From 2012 till 2015 Aachen played in Rugby-Bundesliga.

History
The club was formed in 1980 and has made occasional appearances in the 2nd Rugby-Bundesliga South/West, the second tier of the German league system, playing at this level in 2000–01, 2006–07 and again in 2011–12. In between the club played in the tier three Rugby-Regionalliga North Rhine-Westphalia until becoming a founding member of the 3rd Liga South/West in 2010. The team finished the 2011–12 season on a relegation rank in the 2nd Bundesliga but, courtesy to an expansion of the Rugby-Bundesliga from ten to 24 teams, was instead promoted to the first tier of German rugby, the Bundesliga. RCA finished sixth in their group in the 2012–13 season and failed to qualify for the championship round, instead entering the second tier DRV-Pokal, where it came fifth in the south/west division. The club advanced to the quarterfinals of the play-offs after opponent USV Potsdam Rugby canceled their first round play-off game. In the quarterfinals it was knocked out by TSV Handschuhsheim after a 0—107 defeat.

The club once more qualified for the play-offs to the DRV-Pokal in 2013–14, where it lost to Heidelberger TV in the semifinals of the playoffs. In the 2014–15 season the club finished fourth in the south-west DRV-Pokal group and was knocked out by DSV 78 Hannover II in the quarterfinals of the play-offs after a first round victory over Bremen 1860. With the reduction of the Bundesliga from 24 to 16 clubs Aachen dropped back to the 2. Bundesliga in 2015.

Former German captain Mustafa Güngör hails from Aachen and began his rugby career at the club in 1990.

Club honours
 Rugby-Regionalliga North Rhine-Westphalia
 Champions: 2002, 2006

Recent seasons
Recent seasons of the club:

 Until 2001, when the single-division Bundesliga was established, the season was divided in autumn and spring, a Vorrunde and Endrunde, whereby the top teams of the Rugby-Bundesliga would play out the championship while the bottom teams together with the autumn 2nd Bundesliga champion would play for Bundesliga qualification. The remainder of the 2nd Bundesliga teams would play a spring round to determine the relegated clubs. Where two placing's are shown, the first is autumn, the second spring. In 2012 the Bundesliga was expanded from ten to 24 teams and the 2nd Bundesliga from 20 to 24  with the leagues divided into four regional divisions.

References

External links
 Official website
 RC Aachen team info at totalrugby.de 

German rugby union clubs
Rugby clubs established in 1980
Rugby union in North Rhine-Westphalia
Sport in Aachen
1980 establishments in West Germany